Aetholix is a genus of moths of the family Crambidae.

Species
Aetholix borneensis Hampson, 1912
Aetholix flavibasalis (Guenée, 1854)
Aetholix indecisalis (Warren, 1896)
Aetholix litanalis (Walker, 1859)
Aetholix meropalis (Walker, 1859)

References

Spilomelinae
Crambidae genera
Taxa named by Julius Lederer